Abi or ABI  may refer to:

Organizations

United States
 American Bankruptcy Institute
 American Beverage Institute
 American Biographical Institute
 Applied Biosystems Inc.

Elsewhere
 Agencia Boliviana de Información, a Bolivian press agency
 Association of British Insurers
 Associazione Bancaria Italiana
 Anheuser-Busch InBev, a multinational Belgian-Brazilian beverage and brewing company

People
 Abi (actor) (1965–2017), Indian impressionist, comedian, and actor
 Abi (singer) (born 1997), American country singer/songwriter 
 Abigail (name), abbreviation of female given name
 Abi Kusno Nachran (1940–2006), Indonesian environmental activist
 Abijah (queen), mother of King Hezekiah, called Abi once in the Kuran
 Mustafa Abi (born 1979), Turkish basketball player
 Abi Masatora (born 1994), Japanese sumo wrestler

Places
 Abi, Iran, a village in Zanjan Province
 Abi, Cross River, Nigeria

Science and technology
 Application binary interface, a low-level computer programming interface
 Acquired brain injury
 AbiWord, a free and open source software word processor
 Ankle-brachial index, the ratio of the blood pressure in the lower legs to the blood pressure in the arms
 Advanced Baseline Imager, on the GOES-R satellite
 Auditory brainstem implant

Other uses
 abi, ISO 639-3 code for the Abidji language, spoken in Ivory Coast
 ABI, IATA airport code for Abilene Regional Airport, Texas, United States
 Abitur, a designation used in some European countries for final exams
 Arabian Business International, an international magazine
 Autovehicul Blindat pentru Intervenție, a Romanian armored car

See also
 Abbi (disambiguation)
 ABI1, Abelson interactor gene 1
 ABI2, Abelson interactor gene 2
 ABI3, Abelson interactor gene 3
 Abis (disambiguation)